Oman News Agency (ONA) is the official news agency of the government of Oman. It was established by royal decree in 1997. It is bilingual in English and Arabic languages.BBC Oman Media

See also
 Federation of Arab News Agencies (FANA)

References

External links
 Official website

1997 establishments in Oman
Government agencies established in 1997
News agencies based in Oman
Government of Oman